Theresa Oswald is a politician in Manitoba, Canada.  She was a New Democratic Party member of the Legislative Assembly of Manitoba from 2003 to 2016 and a cabinet minister from 2004 until she stepped down in 2014 to unsuccessfully challenge Premier Greg Selinger for the party's leadership.

Early life
Oswald was born and raised in the St. Vital neighbourhood of Winnipeg, Manitoba, and was a teacher and school administrator for fifteen years before entering politics.  She initially taught English, later serving as vice-principal at Victor Mager School, Winnipeg in the Louis Riel Division.  In the latter capacity, she frequently worked with children and families who arrived in Canada from war-ravaged countries.  Oswald has also been involved in local groups such as the Victoria Hospital, the Zoological Society of Manitoba and Take Pride Winnipeg!.

Political career
Oswald was part of the NDP's historic breakthrough in south-end Winnipeg in the provincial election of 2003, defeating incumbent Progressive Conservative Louise Dacquay in the riding of Seine River, 4,314 votes to 3,582.  The NDP had never won this riding before.  Oswald's campaign focused on greater access to post-secondary education and a tuition freeze for university students.

In August 2004, Oswald was appointed to lead a task-force committee looking for ways to encourage physical activity in the province's youth.

Oswald was appointed as a cabinet minister in Gary Doer's government on October 12, 2004, serving as the Minister responsible for Healthy Living, Seniors and Healthy Child Manitoba.  In 2006, she was promoted to Minister of Health, where she introduced bold new initiatives such as making a family doctor available to every Manitoban, new investments in women's and maternal health, promoted organ donation and introduced groundbreaking legislation to require life-saving heart defibrillators in public places. Her work to improve cancer care, including making all cancer drugs available to patients at no charge, was celebrated by the Canadian Cancer Society with a Diamond Jubilee medal.

She was re-elected with an increased majority in the 2007 provincial election.

In 2013 she was again promoted to lead the government's new flagship department of Jobs and the Economy, where she has since focused on expanding access to training programs to help increase the supply of skilled workers, expanded supports for start-ups and young entrepreneurs and introduced a boost to housing benefits for those on social assistance and the working poor.

Challenge to Selinger's leadership
Oswald resigned her cabinet position on November 3, 2014, along with Jennifer Howard, Erin Selby, Stan Struthers, and Andrew Swan due to concerns about Premier Selinger's leadership. On December 21, 2014, Oswald declared her candidacy for the party leadership. Oswald was defeated by a margin of 33 votes on the second ballot at the leadership convention on March 8, 2015, by Selinger. Oswald remained an MLA after her defeat but did not run for re-election as an MLA in the 2016 provincial election.

Electoral results

|Progressive Conservative
|Louise Dacquay
| style="text-align:right;" |3,582
| style="text-align:right;" |42.40

References

New Democratic Party of Manitoba MLAs
Canadian people of German descent
Women MLAs in Manitoba
Living people
Members of the Executive Council of Manitoba
Politicians from Winnipeg
Women government ministers of Canada
21st-century Canadian politicians
21st-century Canadian women politicians
Year of birth missing (living people)